Borji-ye Kheyl (also Romanized as Borjī-ye Kheyl; also known as Borj-e Kheyl) is a village in Kiakola Rural District, in the Central District of Simorgh County, Mazandaran Province, Iran. At the 2006 census, its population was 350, in 85 families.

References 

Populated places in Simorgh County